Various factions fought over Ukrainian territory after the collapse of the Russian Empire following the Russian Revolution of 1917 and after the First World War ended in 1918, resulting in  the collapse of Austria-Hungary, which had ruled  Ukrainian Galicia. The crumbling of the empires had a great effect on  the Ukrainian nationalist movement, and in a short period of four years a number of Ukrainian governments sprang up. This period was characterized by optimism and by nation-building, as well as by chaos and civil war. Matters stabilized somewhat in 1921 with the territory of modern-day Ukraine divided between Soviet Ukraine (which would become a constituent republic of the Soviet Union in 1922) and Poland, and with small  ethnic-Ukrainian regions belonging to Czechoslovakia and to Romania.

Alliance and strife 

After the abdication of Tsar Nicholas II, Ukrainian community leaders were able finally to organized the Central Rada in Kyiv (Tsentral’na rada), headed by Mykhailo Hrushevsky. They sought an approval of the Russian Provisional Government in Petrograd (St Petersburg) to establish a regional government. The Central Rada consisted of various political parties such as Ukrainian Party of Socialist Revolutionary, Ukrainian Social Democratic Labour Party, Russian Social Democratic Labour Party, General Jewish Labor Bund, Polish national party, representatives of Army, peasantry, workers, and others. It quickly gained the support of elements of the Imperial Army in Ukraine. On June 23, 1917, the Central Rada issued its First Universal, declaring Ukrainian autonomy within a Russian federation, which was enthusiastically supported by the First All-Ukrainian Peasant Congress on June 28.

Shortly after the early-November Bolshevik coup in Petrograd and a similar event in Kyiv, the Central Rada issued the Third Universal on November 20, 1917, declaring a Ukrainian People's Republic (UNR) in Kyiv and condemning the Bolsheviks initiated disorder in Petrograd as politically illegal. Because the legal government in Petrograd was dissolved, the Central Rada had no other choice but to declare its autonomy with its own regional government that was previously approved by the Russian Provisional Government. The UNR refused to recognize the newly installed Soviet government, which in turn caused a tension within the Central Rada. The Bolshevik government demanded an all-Russian union. The Bolsheviks faction convened an All-Ukrainian Congress of Workers', Soldiers', and Peasants' Soviets in Kyiv in December demanding recognition of Sovnarkom from the Central Rada. Finding themselves to be a small minority at the congress of 2,500 delegates, the 100 Bolsheviks and a few others left to join a congress of local deputies in Kharkiv which they renamed the All-Ukrainian Congress of Workers', Soldiers', and Peasants' Soviets. They declared the Bolshevik government of Ukraine (Respublyka Rad Ukrayiny) with Christian Rakovksy as its head on December 25, 1917 and claimed that the government of the Ukrainian People's Republic were outlaws.

Upon taking over the government in Petrograd, the Bolsheviks immediately sued for peace with the Central Powers. After more than two months of negotiations, the Soviet delegation led by Joffe signed the Treaty of Brest-Litovsk, a peace treaty between Russia and the Central Powers, on March 3, 1918. This treaty granted Ukraine independence from Russian control. An independent Ukraine was not a popular notion among Russians. An independent Ukraine coupled with the 1918 Russian great hunger greatly weakened the leadership of Lenin and the Bolsheviks in Russia. Ukraine continued to gain territory after the treaty was signed because the armies of the Central Powers pushed deeper into Russia, thus freeing more Ukrainians from Russian control especially in the Kuban and in the lands of the Don Cossacks and the Terek Cossacks all of which contained very large Ukrainian populations. By late spring 1918, Ukraine with support from the Central Powers had gained control of the lower Volga River and began to receive oil shipments from Baku through the Volga ports of Tsaritsyn and Saratov. During May to October 1918, peace negotiations were held between Russia and Ukraine. The Cossacks fiercely abhorred Bolshevism. After the July 6, 1918, assassination in Moscow of the German Ambassador to Russia Count Mirbach, many Bolsheviks who resented the terms of the peace treaty began guerrilla warfare and terror with support from Felix Dzerzhinsky, the head of the Cheka.

In late 1917 to early 1918, the UNR for couple of months lost Kyiv to the Bolsheviks, but the UNR with Central Powers support controlled of much of Ukraine, pushed the Bolsheviks out of Kyiv on March 1, 1918, and forced the Bolsheviks to convene their government in Taganrog, Russia, on the coast of the Sea of Azov. The Congress of Free Hubb'andmen on April 29, 1918 (with the great support of Austrian-German occupants), elected tsarist general P.P.Skoropadsky as Hetman of Ukraine. He proclaimed the overthrow of the Central Rada Government thus suspending the UNR and also outlawed the Communist Party in Ukraine. After the socialist Directorate of Ukraine overthrew the Hetman's government and then reestablished the UNR on November 13–14, 1918, the Bolsheviks forces with support from Moscow renewed their aggression claiming to be led by the government of Ukraine. Ukraine sent a note of protest requesting to cease the hostilities; Sovnarkom first ignored the request and later stated that it has nothing to do with the war in Ukraine. The Ukrainian government declared a war on January 16, 1919. The Bolsheviks amid fluid alliances with various anarchists would eventually defeat the Ukrainian army that was fighting on several fronts simultaneously.

Meanwhile, the Western Ukrainian People's Republic (ZUNR) was declared in Lviv on October 19, 1918. Within the ZUNR were  the largest oil reserves in Europe. The ZUNR formally (and largely symbolically) joined the UNR in hope to gain some support in the war against Poland. A UNR delegation sent to Paris could not gain recognition at the Treaty of Versailles at the end of the World War. UNR forces fared poorly during Polish-Soviet War and a late alliance with Poland wasn't enough to secure the republic. After the Polish-Soviet Peace of Riga, Ukrainian territory found itself split among the Ukrainian SSR in the center, Poland in the west, and Crimea, Kuban, and the former Cossacks lands became southern Russia in the east. Carpathian Ruthenia found itself in Czechoslovakia, and Bukovina in Romania. Ukraine was a rump state of its former self.

In December 1922, with Bolsheviks secure in their power over its territory, Soviet Ukraine joined the Russian, Byelorussian, and Transcaucasian republics to form the Union of Soviet Socialist Republics.

International involvements

The chaotic conditions in Ukraine attracted attention from the major powers.  Canadian scholar Orest Subtelny provides a context from the long span of European history:
 In 1919 total chaos engulfed Ukraine. Indeed, in the modern history of Europe no country experienced such complete anarchy, bitter civil strife, and total collapse of authority as did Ukraine at this time. Six different armies-– those of the Ukrainians, the Bolsheviks, the Whites, the Entente [French], the Poles and the anarchists – operated on its territory. Kyiv changed hands five times in less than a year. Cities and regions were cut off from each other by the numerous fronts. Communications with the outside world broke down almost completely. The starving cities emptied as people moved into the countryside in their search for food.

Outside powers acted on entirely different visions for Ukraine. The British ridiculed the pretensions of the new nation. White Russians, united only by their opposition to Bolshevism, wanted to restore Ukraine as a Russian province. Russian Bolsheviks did not believe in nationalism and twice invaded Ukraine and failed efforts to seize control and collectivize the farms; they succeeded the third time in 1920. Americans were outraged at the large-scale massacres of Jews in 1919. Germany supported Ukrainian nationalism as a foil to Russia, but its chief goal was to obtain urgently needed food supplies. Ukraine was too poorly organized to fulfill the promised food shipments. Poland wanted Ukraine in order to build a population that could stand up against Germany. France wanted Poland as a strong anti-German ally and therefore supported Polish ambitions. Poland did seize Ukraine in 1919, but was driven out from all but western Ukraine in the Polish–Soviet War in 1920.

Ukrainian Nationalist governments (1917–1920) 
 Central Rada of the Ukrainian People's Republic: March 17, 1917 – April 29, 1918.
 Hetmanate of the Ukrainian State: April 29, 1918 – December 14, 1918.
 Ukrainian National Council of the West Ukrainian People's Republic: October 18, 1918 – January 22, 1919 (de facto independent until July 1919).
 Directorate of the Ukrainian People's Republic: November 14, 1918 – 1920.

Ukrainian Soviet Governments

 Ukrainian People's Republic of Soviets: December 25, 1917 – March 1918.
 Second Ukrainian Soviet government: November 20, 1918 – August 1919.
 All-Ukrainian Revolutionary Committee: April 1919 – July 1919.
 Third Ukrainian Soviet government: December 21, 1919 – 1991.
 Galician Revkom: July 8, 1920 – September 21, 1920

See also 
 Battleship Potemkin uprising
 Nestor Makhno

Notes

References

Sources 
 Magocsi, Paul Robert (1996). A History of Ukraine. Toronto: University of Toronto Press. .
 Subtelny, Orest (1988). Ukraine: A History, 1st edition, Toronto: University of Toronto Press. .
 Velychenko, Stephen (2010). Statebuilding in Revolutionary Ukraine. A Comparative Study of Governments and Bureaucrats 1917-1922 (Toronto 2012) 
 Velychenko, Stephen, Painting Imperialism and Nationalism Red. The Ukrainian Marxist Critique of Russian Communist Rule in Ukraine (1918-1925) (Toronto, 2015)

Further reading

Modern history of Ukraine

.
.
.
.
.
History of Ukraine (1795–1918)
History of Ukraine (1918–1991)
Revolutions in Ukraine
Ukrainian independence movement